Syed Humayun Kabir was a Bangladeshi philanthropist. He was the founder and chairman of Sajida Foundation and Renata Limited. He died on 7 July 2015 at age 83.

References

Further reading
 
 
 
 

Year of birth missing
2015 deaths
Bangladeshi philanthropists